Vyali is a Hindu goddess with the supposed power to protect the places where rites are performed.

References

Hindu goddesses